Leonard Hanson (1 November 1887 – 27 October 1949) was a British gymnast who competed in the 1908 Summer Olympics and in the 1912 Summer Olympics. He was born in Bradford.

In 1908 he participated in the individual all-around competition, but his place is unknown. He was part of the British team, which won the bronze medal in the gymnastics men's team, European system event in 1912. In the individual all-around competition he finished twelfth.

References

External links
Leonard Hanson's profile at databaseOlympics
Leonard Hanson's profile at Sports Reference.com

1887 births
1949 deaths
Sportspeople from Bradford
British male artistic gymnasts
Gymnasts at the 1908 Summer Olympics
Gymnasts at the 1912 Summer Olympics
Olympic gymnasts of Great Britain
Olympic bronze medallists for Great Britain
Olympic medalists in gymnastics
Medalists at the 1912 Summer Olympics
20th-century British people